Skirts Ahoy! is a 1952 musical film directed by Sidney Lanfield, and starring Esther Williams, Vivian Blaine and Joan Evans. Shot in Technicolor, the film follows several women who join the WAVES with sequences filmed on location at the Great Lakes Naval Training Station. It also features the film debut of Billy Eckstine.

Plot

Three young women who have had traumatic emotional experiences in their lives decide to change their lives by enlisting in the WAVES. Mary Kate Yarborough, a "girl next door" from the Midwest, was jilted by her fiancé. Whitney Young, a socialite from Long Island who has been engaged multiple times, left her fiancé standing at the altar. Una Yancy, a blonde ditz from New York City, is determined to track down Archie, her boyfriend in the Navy she has only heard from twice in two years, and be assigned to the same station he is serving in; he last contacted her from Paris. The only thing they have in common is their last names all start with the letter Y.

They are sent to the Great Lakes Naval Training Center for WAVE boot camp and are assigned to the same company, becoming roommates. Whitney is named recruit company commander after saving Mary Kate from drowning during swim training. Whitney and Una adapt well to the rigors of boot camp; Mary Kate does not, suffering from severe homesickness to the point she winds up facing an elimination board which can discharge her from the Navy for inadaptability. While Whitney advocates for her, Mary Kate's former fiance shows up and tries to convince her that she will be better with him than in the Navy.  She becomes angry, and goes before the board and convinces them to allow her to continue in the Navy.

Granted a pass midway through their training, the trio go to Chicago looking for a good time. They learn to their displeasure that while the sailors have no trouble meeting girls, it is harder for the WAVES to meet guys. On the advice of a waiter, Una and Whitney go to a newly-coed bar in a downtown hotel, where Whitney picks up a man a year or two older. Unbeknownst to her, he is the newly assigned doctor of the WAVE training battalion in civvies. They have a cordial dinner, with an ending spoiled by three WACs. Young decks all three of them, and is brought before a board of inquiry. Her bacon is saved by the testimony of LT Dr. Paul Elliot, her date from the night before, who after the board dismisses her without disciplinary action rebukes her for her behavior.

On the way back to her barracks, Whitney passes the base swimming pool, where a young brother and sister are arguing. She takes them in hand, and the three of them spend a happy hour swimming, diving, and playing in the pool. (This sequence is one of the few filmed performances of the Aquatots.)

At a USO dance for personnel of all the services, a precision drill platoon made up of black WAVES puts on an impressive performance. This is followed up by a song and dance number featuring Debbie Reynolds and Bobby Van, introduced by Keenan Wynn. Una asks Dr. Elliot to dance, and tries to maneuver him to where Whitney is standing. He resists, and Whitney leaves the dance. Her big night finishes with her dancing with Pops, the civilian plumber who spends his time trying to keep the barracks plumbing from being clogged by half-eaten all day suckers.

Still attracted to Dr. Elliot, Whitney trails him to a moviehouse one Saturday night. The two of them hold a whispered, intense discussion about their characters, with Elliot throwing Whitney's history of 12 engagements in her face and her ripping him for his air of superiority in social matters. She storms out of the theater, and a crusty Navy captain whose medals are headed up by the Navy Cross and the Navy Distinguished Service Medal, who had overheard their argument, tells Elliot that he'd be a damned fool to let that one get away. After returning to the base, Whitney performs a solo aquatic ballet in the base swimming pool.

Upon graduation of the training company, the trio of new-fledged WAVES is broken up. Mary Kate is assigned to Brooklyn. Una gets the assignment she had hoped for – Paris, France, the last known location of her boyfriend Archie – only to learn that he has just been assigned to Great Lakes for a year. Whitney is sent for advanced individual training in Washington, DC before being sent on to an overseas assignment. All three of their love interests meet them at the train station, promising to get assignments so they can be together. The new Seaman Second Class WAVES wave goodbye to their guys as the Twentieth Century Limited takes them to New York and further adventures.

Cast
Esther Williams as Whitney Young
Joan Evans as Mary Kate Yarbrough (singing voice was dubbed by Joan Elms)
Vivian Blaine as Una Yancy
Barry Sullivan as Lt. Cmdr. Paul Elcott
Keefe Brasselle as Dick Hallson
Billy Eckstine as himself
Dean Miller as Archie O'Conovan
The DeMarco Sisters as the Williams sisters
Juanita Moore as Black Drill Team Member

Bobba and Kathy Tongay, better known as the Aquatots, made an uncredited cameo appearance in the movie. Kathy was murdered by their father in 1953; Bobba became a lifeguard in Miami in adulthood.

Debbie Reynolds and Bobby Van made a minor appearance in the film, performing a rendition of "Oh By Jingo!".

Production
In March 1951 MGM announced that Isobel Lennart was writing Skirts Ahoy! for Esther Williams, Vic Damone and Vera-Ellen with Joe Pasternak producing. Williams would make the movie following Texas Carnival.

By July the film was going to star Williams, Sally Forest (replacing Vera Ellen) and Vivian Blaine. Blaine was going to take a leave of absence from the Broadway production of Guys and Dolls. Sidney Lanfield signed to direct. Then Forest was out of the film.  Keefe Brasselle replaced Vic Damone.

Filming started September 1951.

Reception
According to MGM records, Skirts Ahoy! earned $2,585,000 in the US and Canada and $1,464,000 overseas, resulting in a profit of $342,000 from a budget of $2,003,000.

References

External links

1952 films
Films directed by Sidney Lanfield
Metro-Goldwyn-Mayer films
1952 musical films
Films produced by Joe Pasternak
American musical films
1950s English-language films
1950s American films